Chagrin is a Hebrew-language surname. Notable people with the surname include:

 Francis Chagrin (1905-1972), Romanian-born British composer
 Julian Chagrin (born 1940), British-Israeli actor
 Rolanda Chagrin (born 1957), Israeli actress and comedian

Hebrew-language surnames